South Korean boy band BTS has performed in five concert tours (three of which have been worldwide), six fan meeting tours, four joint tours, eight showcases, and 41 concerts since their debut in 2013. BTS' debut solo concert tour in 2014, The Red Bullet Tour, began in Asia and then expanded to Australia, North America, and South America, attracting 80,000 spectators. In the midst of The Red Bullet Tour, BTS also held its first concert tour of Japan, Wake Up: Open Your Eyes Japan Tour. In 2015, BTS commenced The Most Beautiful Moment in Life On Stage Tour, which visited various cities in Asia and sold over 182,500 tickets. In 2017, BTS embarked on The Wings Tour, which visited 17 cities in 10 countries around the world and attracted 550,000 spectators. 

BTS' next tour broke records, with the 2018–19 Love Yourself World Tour grossing $196.4 million from its last 42 shows, becoming the highest-grossing tour by an act that performs primarily in a non-English language in history. The band's supposed sixth tour, the Map of the Soul Tour, was originally slated to visit 18 cities across nine countries, beginning with four shows in South Korea in April 2020. With the onset of the COVID-19 pandemic, the initial shows were cancelled. The rest of the tour was temporarily postponed in April 2020, and then cancelled in its entirety on August 19, 2021. The band later embarked on the Permission to Dance on Stage concert series, that began with an online-only concert held at Seoul Olympic Stadium in October, then expanded to include their first live performances before an in-person audience in two years, with four shows at SoFi Stadium in Los Angeles in November and December, and ended with four shows at Allegiant Stadium in Las Vegas in April 2022. Comprising 12 performances in total, the series attracted over 4 million attendees, including online viewers and global live-event cinema patrons. BTS' SoFi shows grossed $33.3 million from 214,000 tickets sold and set several records, including earning the biggest box office score by any act in nearly a decade; becoming the largest-grossing run of shows at a single venue since 2012; the biggest US-based boxscore in 18 years; and the sixth best-grossing engagement in Billboard Boxscore history. The band became the first non-English-language act to surpass $20 and $30 million in a single engagement. For the Allegiant shows, BTS are the only act to sell out four nights and 200,000 tickets at the stadium.

Tours

Concerts

Fanmeeting tours

Showcases

Joint tours and concerts

Performances on award shows, television shows and specials

Notes

References

Lists of concert tours
Lists of concert tours of South Korean artists
Lists of events in South Korea
South Korean music-related lists